The 1912 Oklahoma Sooners football team represented the University of Oklahoma as an independent during the 1912 college football season. In their eighth year under head coach Bennie Owen, the Sooners compiled a 5–4 record, and outscored their opponents by a combined total of 197 to 80.

Schedule

References

Oklahoma
Oklahoma Sooners football seasons
Oklahoma Sooners football